Juxtolena is a genus of moths belonging to the family Tortricidae.

Species
Juxtolena omphalia Razowski & Becker, 1993
Juxtolena oncodina Razowski & Becker, 1994

See also
List of Tortricidae genera

References

 , 2011: Diagnoses and remarks on genera of Tortricidae, 2: Cochylini (Lepidoptera: Tortricidae). Shilap Revista de Lepidopterologia 39 (156): 397–414.
 , 1993. Revta lepid. 21 (84) : 235.

External links

tortricidae.com

Cochylini
Tortricidae genera